Almendra is a village and municipality in the province of Salamanca, western Spain, part of the autonomous community of Castile and León. As of 2016 it has a population of 166 inhabitants.

See also 
 Province of Salamanca
 The Almendra Dam

References

Municipalities in the Province of Salamanca